Father Christmas is a 1991 British animated short film starring Mel Smith as Father Christmas. Created for Channel 4 and first broadcast on Christmas Eve 1991 in Britain, the story is an adaption of two books written by Raymond Briggs - Father Christmas and Father Christmas Goes on Holiday - and is the second animated adaptation of Briggs' work made for the channel, following the 1982 animated short The Snowman. 

The story focuses on a stereotypical vision of Father Christmas with a down-to-earth twist, living in contemporary Britain with his pets and reindeer, coping with everyday domestic chores, who recounts to the viewers about a holiday he took before preparing for another Christmas.

The film was dedicated to the late animator John McGuire. It was later released as part of a DVD bundle alongside The Snowman, before being released separately in subsequent home media releases.

Plot

After delivering presents on Christmas Eve, Father Christmas returns to his house in contemporary Britain. As he settles down and warms up, he greets the viewers and explains how he is busy throughout the year caring for his reindeer and pets, tending to his garden, and doing the housework and shopping. Fed up with it one year, he explains how he decided to go on holiday for a change, as the film goes back to the day when he made that decision. After debating on where to go on holiday to, Father Christmas decided on France and converted his sleigh into a camper van. After placing his dog and cat into a kennel, before having his reindeer fly him to his destination.

At first, he enjoys the French countryside he settles into, but the French food he orders at a restaurant makes him become ill. After relocating to a campsite with amenities to help him cope while he recovers, he eventually is forced to move on when people begin to recognise him. Deciding on Scotland, Father Chriustmas enjoys his time in a local pub and buys a kilt, but hates the bad weather and the cold waters of a nearby loch. Fed up, he decides to go to Las Vegas, where he checks into a casino resort. Once there, he spends his time enjoying the food, pool and nightlife for a few weeks. However, he eventually leaves when he runs out of money and is recognised by his children. After returning home, he prepares to relax, until letters addressed to Father Christmas begin to arrive shortly after retrieving his pets. He thus spends the next few months reading through each and sorting out presents.

On Christmas Eve, Father Christmas heads out on his sleigh and begins delivering presents, dealing with the various households he must visit. At the annual snowmen's party, he greets James and his snowman, while partaking in the festivities. However, his enjoyment comes to an end when the pair find he neglected to deliver two presents to Buckingham Palace. Not wishing to leave the matter unresolved, Father Christmas delivers them before the dawn of Christmas Day, and returns home. Back in the present, Father Christmas completes his story to the viewers, before sorting out his dinner for the day, and examining the presents he will have waiting, whereupon he wishes the viewers a "Happy Bloomin' Christmas" before going to sleep as dawn breaks outside.

Links to other works
Father Christmas and The Snowman take place in the same universe—both were written by the same author, and both television shorts were made by very similar production teams. It is suggested that this film takes place a year or so after The Snowman, as Father Christmas jokes to the boy "glad you could make it again; the party I mean, not your snowman”, which ultimately gives The Snowman a happy ending. The boy can also be seen wearing the scarf Father Christmas gave him in The Snowman. There is also a poster of the snowman in one of the rooms when Father Christmas is delivering presents. The snowman himself can also be seen in Father Christmas' yard during the credits.

In Father Christmas, Ernest the milkman from Ethel & Ernest can be seen delivering milk to the Royal Family on Christmas morning, and Jim and Hilda Bloggs from Gentleman Jim/When the Wind Blows are shown enjoying a drink in the Scottish pub.

American version
A heavily sanitised American version was produced. The most notable change is that Father Christmas was re-voiced by William Dennis Hunt, becoming much jollier, and all 76 instances of the word "blooming" (75 by Father Christmas, 1 by a child's voice in a song) were replaced with "merry". Scenes where Father Christmas gets drunk, over-eats, dances with chorus girls and suffers a hangover were removed. Also cut are a few candid moments showing his "builders' bum" and sitting on the lavatory.

See also
 List of Christmas films
 List of films set in Las Vegas
 Santa Claus in film

References

External links

Father Christmas on Toonhound.com

1991 films
1991 short films
1990s animated short films
1991 animated films
British children's films
British Christmas films
British animated short films
Animated films based on children's books
Christmas television specials
1990s children's films
1990s English-language films
1990s British films